Masagram  is a  Kolkata Suburban Railway station on the Howrah–Bardhaman chord and is located in Purba Bardhaman district in the Indian state of West Bengal. It serves Masagram and surrounding villages. The construction of the Bankura–Masagram line made Masagram a junction station. The Damodar flows nearby.

History
The Howrah–Bardhaman chord, a shorter link to Bardhaman from Howrah than the Howrah–Bardhaman main line, was constructed in 1917.

Electrification
Howrah–Bardhaman chord was electrified in 1964–66.

Passengers
Around 3,000 passengers use Masagram railway station every day.

Bankura Masagram line
The  Bankura–Masagram line will connect to the Howrah–Bardhaman chord near Masagram. The  bridge over the Damodar has already been constructed, and work on the last sector, the Mathnasipur-Masagram new line project, was  inaugurated on 16 April 2013.

References

External links

  Trains at Masagram

Railway stations in Purba Bardhaman district
Howrah railway division
Kolkata Suburban Railway stations
Railway junction stations in India